Monestier is a commune in the Ardèche department in southern France. This village is extended on 7.414 km². It is located in a mountainous area, between 617m and 1387m elevation.

Population

See also
Communes of the Ardèche department

References

Communes of Ardèche
Ardèche communes articles needing translation from French Wikipedia